is a Japanese film director and screenwriter (born 8 August, 1934) known for his work in yakuza films and jidaigeki.

Career
Born in Chiba Prefecture, he attended Hibiya High School and then the University of Tokyo before joining the Tōei studio in 1959. Working at Tōei's Kyoto studio, he served as an assistant director under such directors as Masahiro Makino, Tadashi Imai, and Tomotaka Tasaka. He made his directorial debut in 1964 Kunoichi ninpō and won the Directors Guild of Japan New Directors Award in 1966 for Yakuza (893) gurentai, the first gendaigeki shot at Tōei's Kyoto studio. He directed such popular film series as Kogarashi Monjirō and Nihon no don, and also worked on television. His 1985 film Seburi monogatari was entered into the 35th Berlin International Film Festival. From 1987 to 2008 he served as a professor of the Osaka University of Arts. He has directed over 60 films in his career.

Selected filmography
 Kunoichi ninpō (くノ一忍法) (1964)
 Kunoichi Keshō (くノ一化粧) (1964)
 Yakuza (893) gurentai (893愚連隊) (1966)
 Memoir of Japanese Assassinations (日本暗殺秘録, Nihon ansatsu hiroku) (1969)
 Kogarashi Monjirō (1972)
 Aesthetics of a Bullet (鉄砲玉の美学, Teppōdama no bigaku) (1973)
 Girl Boss: Escape From Reform School (女番長 感化院脱走, Sukeban: Kankain Dassô) (1973)
 Tokyo-Seoul-Bangkok Drug Triangle (1973)
 Bohachi Bushido Saburai (1974) -Script
 Crazed Beast (狂った野獣, Kurutta yajû) (1976)
 Yakuza sensō: Nihon no Don (やくざ戦争 日本の首領) (1977)
 Sanada Yukimura no Bōryaku (1979)
 Conquest (1982)
 Theater of Life (人生劇場, Jinsei gekijō) (1983) co-directed with Kinji Fukasaku and Jun'ya Satō
 Appassionata (序の舞, Jo no mai) (1984)
 Seburi monogatari (1985)
 Takeda Shingen (武田信玄) (1988) (TV Movie)
 Shogun's Shadow (1989) (Screenplay)
 Nemuri Kyoshiro: The Man with No Tomorrow (1996) (TV Movie)
 Chambara: The Art of Japanese Swordplay (2015)
 Love's Twisting Path (2019)

References

Bibliography

External links
 
 

1934 births
Living people
Japanese film directors
Japanese screenwriters
Samurai film directors
Yakuza film directors
People from Chiba Prefecture
University of Tokyo alumni